James Cerretani and Philipp Marx were the defending champions, but chose not to compete.
Lukáš Dlouhý and Michal Mertiňák won the title, defeating Stefano Ianni and Matteo Viola 2–6, 7–6(7–3), [11–9] in the final.

Seeds

Draw

Draw

References
 Doubles Draw

San Marino CEPU Open - Doubles
San Marino CEPU Open